Bernhard Modern is a modern style classification serif typeface designed by Lucian Bernhard in 1937 for the American Type Founders (ATF).

Lucian Bernhard's Bernhard Modern typeface was the ATF's response to the many popular old-style engraving faces of the early 20th century. A somewhat decorative text typeface, it is distinct for its low x-height, elongated ascenders, and relatively short descenders giving it an appearance of height without requiring excessive leading. Serifs are wide and splayed. The lowercase roman g is unusual for having the upper bowl larger than the lower one.

Fordham University, in New York City, currently uses Bernhard Modern as the central typeface of its design identity. Both the 1959 version of The Twilight Zone and its 2019 revival use Bernhard Modern, with a drop shadow, for titles and credits. The 1990s computer application The Walt Disney World Explorer used Bernhard Modern extensively throughout the program.

References
Johnson, Jaspert & Berry. Encyclopedia of Type Faces. Cassell & Co 2001, .
Ott, Nicolaus, Friedl Fredrich, and Stein Bernard. Typography and Encyclopedic Survey of Type Design and Techniques Throughout History. Black Dog & Leventhal Publishers. 1998, .
Macmillan, Neil. An A–Z of Type Designers. Yale University Press: 2006. .

Modern serif typefaces
Letterpress typefaces
Digital typefaces
Typefaces and fonts introduced in 1937
Typefaces designed by Lucian Bernhard
Display typefaces